Mount Tsakhvoa is a mountain in the Western Caucasus, and is the highest point of Krasnodar Krai, Russia. The height of the summit is 3346 meters above sea level.

Mount Tsakhvoa enjoys popularity with tourists and climbers.

See also
  List of highest points of Russian federal subjects

References

External links 

 Tverdi, A. V., Yefremov, Y. V., Фотоальбом «Кубань с высоты» 

Mountains of Krasnodar Krai
Tsakhvoa